Bruce Lloyd Vaughan (born September 10, 1956) is an American professional golfer.

Vaughan was born in Kankakee, Illinois. He didn't start playing golf until he was 20 and working as a firefighter in Hutchinson, Kansas.

Vaughan turned professional in 1990. He played on the Nationwide Tour from 1992 to 1994, winning twice in 1994. He finished sixth on the money list in 1994 earning him his PGA Tour card for 1995. He struggled on the PGA Tour in 1995, making only 15 cuts in 30 events. He finished 173rd on the money list and lost his card. He played the Nationwide Tour again from 1996 to 1998. He also played the South African Tour for several seasons, winning the Autopage Mount Edgecombe Trophy in 1994 and finishing second on the 1993/94 Order of Merit.

After turning 50, Vaughan qualified for the 2007 Champions Tour by finishing T3 in the qualifying school. He won his first Champions Tour event in 2008 at the Senior British Open, a senior major.

Vaughan resides in Hutchinson, Kansas.

Professional wins (4)

Sunshine Tour wins (1)

Nike Tour wins (2)

Champions Tour wins (1)

Champions Tour playoff record (1–0)

Results in major championships

CUT = missed the halfway cut
"T" indicates a tie for a place
Note: Vaughan never played in the Masters Tournament or the PGA Championship.

Senior major championships

Wins (1)

Senior results timeline
Results not in chronological order before 2017.

CUT = missed the halfway cut
"T" indicates a tie for a place

See also
 1994 Nike Tour graduates

References

External links
 
 

American male golfers
PGA Tour golfers
Sunshine Tour golfers
PGA Tour Champions golfers
Winners of senior major golf championships
Korn Ferry Tour graduates
Golfers from Illinois
Golfers from Kansas
Sportspeople from Kankakee, Illinois
Sportspeople from Hutchinson, Kansas
1956 births
Living people